Mérida Province was a province of the Spanish Empire in the 17th century (1622–1676), with Mérida as its capital. It was part of the New Kingdom of Granada, and was formed initially in 1607 with a merger with the La Grita Province, forming an administrative unit below province status (Corregimiento de Mérida y La Grita), which it attained in 1622. In 1676 it merged with Maracaibo to form what became known as Maracaibo Province.

Provinces of the Spanish Empire
Geography of South America
History of South America
Colonial Venezuela
1622 establishments in the Spanish Empire

es:Provincia de Mérida